INS Shakti has been the name borne by three tankers which served in the Indian Navy.

 , displacing 3,000 tonnes, was acquired in November 1953, commissioned on 29 January 1954 and decommissioned on 31 December 1967.
  was a  replenishment oiler  built in Germany, commissioned on 21 February 1976 and decommissioned on 21 July 2007.
 , a modern  displacing 27,550 tonnes, commissioned in 2011.

References

Indian Navy ship names
Ships of the Indian Navy